The Hannah Nash Dowding House, at 8830 S 60 E in Sandy, Utah, was built around 1898.  It was listed on the National Register of Historic Places in 2000.

It is a one-story, wood-frame hall-parlor plan cottage.

It was deemed "a typical example of a residence for the earliest working class citizens of Sandy."

It is also located at 280 South 300 West.

References

National Register of Historic Places in Salt Lake County, Utah
Houses completed in 1898